Alexeyevka is a rural locality (a selo) and the administrative center of Alexeyevsky Selsoviet, Blagoveshchensky District, Altai Krai, Russia. The population was 347 as of 2013. There are 4 streets.

Geography 
Alexeyevka is located 56 km east of Blagoveshchenka (the district's administrative centre) by road. Alexandrovka is the nearest rural locality.

References 

Rural localities in Blagoveshchensky District, Altai Krai